Anton Goosen (born 5 March 1946) is a South African musician and songwriter. He became a pivotal figure in Afrikaans music and is generally regarded as the father of Afrikaans Rock.

Early years
As a young boy in school, Goosen was not considered 'bright'. At the age of 9, his teachers sought to place him in a class for mentally challenged children as his behaviour became disruptive. When he was 17, a guidance counsellor suggested to Goosen that he abandon his music career.

In 1963, Goosen was expelled from boarding school after being caught in a bath playing guitar and smoking. His guitar was confiscated and its case filled with bricks. Despite this, Goosen persevered and formed his high school's first rock band that same year.

Goosen attended the Teachers Training College Heidelberg, and qualified in Special Education after which he taught school for awhile, and worked as a writer and reviewer for Beeld, before becoming a full-time song writer.

Career
Goosen wrote songs for other artists, most notably and prodigiously for Sonja Herholdt, but also for Carike Keuzenkamp, Laurika Rauch, Richard Clayderman, Francis Goya, and Koos Kombuis. He released his own first album, Boy Van Die Suburbs, in 1979, and it sold over 80,000 copies. He was noted for being the first to produce an album of his own works entirely in Afrikaans.  He used irony and symbolism in his songs to protest against removals to Bantustans and to underline the injustices behind the Soweto riots.

Goosen is noted for two films for which he wrote music and directed: n Brief vir Simone (1980) and Sing vir die Harlekyn (1980). He wrote the theme music for Die Laaste Tango (2013), n Pawpaw vir my Darling (2016) and Siembamba (Lullaby) (2017).  As early as 1980 Goosen was referred to as the father of the Afrikaans chanson.

Discography

Singles 
 "Trompie" (1980) Theme from the TV Series 'Trompie' made from the books written by Topsy Smith
 "Boy Van Die Suburbs" (1981)
 "'n Brief Vir Simone" (1981) Theme from the film of the same name
 "Deurdruk Dag Toe" (1981)
 "Baai Baai Bokkie" (1983)

Albums 

 Boy Van Die Suburbs (1979)
 2de Laan 58 (1980)
 Liedjieboer (1980)
 Jors Troelie (1981)
 Lappiesland (1985)
 Liedjieboer In Die Stad/City (1986)
 Winde Van Verandering (1988)
 Danzer (1992)
 Riviersonderend - 21 Greatest Hits (1994)
 Bushrock (Of A White Kaffir In Africa) (1996)
 Putonnerwater (1999)
 n Vis Innie Bos (2001)
 Anton en Vrinne Live in die Staatsteater 2003
 Die Groen Blomme-projek 2005
 33 A-sides (Grootste treffers) 2008
 33 B-sides (getye van verandering) 2008
 33 Sea-sides (om te rock 'n roll) 2008
 Volledig Vol 1 2014
 Volledig Vol 2 2015
 Volledig Vol 3 2016
 Love Songs 2016 
 Padkos 2017
 40jaar liedjieboer innie langpad 2019

Appears On 
 Muses Op Besoek
 Alternatief Op Sy Beste
 Glenys Lynn Treffers
 Jy Is My Liefling
 Houtstok Rockfees
 Die Beste Afrikaanse Album
 Om Te Breyten
 Geraas Musiek Toekennings
 Vloek Van Die Kitaar

Awards

References

External links
 Anton Goosen official website
 Anton Goosen in The South African Rock Encyclopedia

1946 births
20th-century South African male singers
21st-century South African male singers
Afrikaans-language singers
Living people